Popstar Türkiye was a Turkish music competition television series based on the international franchise Popstars. The show was hosted by Haldun Dormen and Gamze Özçelik on Kanal D. The judges were Armağan Çağlayan, Ercan Saatçi, Ahmet San, and Deniz Seki later replaced by Zerrin Özer.

The TV show was a big hit on Turkish television when it was aired.

The winner of the show was Abidin Özşahin, Firdevs Güneş got second place, and Bayhan Gürhan third place. The winner was going to be sent to the United States for a musical education. But one of the judges also proposed to send the runner-up to get the same education and offered to pay for the expenses.

After Popstar Türkiye a spin-off was created named Türkstar which was broadcast on Show TV, and after that another spin-off was created named Popstar Alaturka which focused on Arabesque music. The television series also released a CD album with each contestant singing a song, and later also a Top 10 album with the best songs of each contestant.

Auditions 
To attract contestants, the preliminary rounds were in August and the first half of September in 2003 promoted on TV and application forms were distributed in newspapers by Kanal D under the slogan "the popstar of the future". The requirements to participate was to be at least 18 years old. A total of 3,000 people had applied to participate.

The auditions were held at:
 2 September 2003 - İzmir Crowne Plaza
 5 September 2003 - Antalya IC Airport
 7 September 2003 - Adana Hilton Hotel
 10 September 2003 - Malatya Altın Kayısı Hotel
 12 September 2003 - Ankara Hilton Hotel
 15 September 2003 - Samsun Büyük Samsun Hotel
 17–18 September 2003 - İstanbul Sürmeli Hotel

Kanal D started to air the auditions on TV under the name of Popstar Aranıyor 4 October 2003.

Controversy 
During the elimination rounds quite a few controversial moments happened:
 4th week: It was revealed that Bayhan had a criminal record. And spend four years behind bars for murder.
 5th week: After Bayhan won the first place Deniz Seki started criticizing the voters. She thought that someone with such a criminal past shouldn't be able to become a popstar. The audience started booing her, so she left the show.
That week shots were also fired on Ahmet San's jeep.
 6th week: Zerrin Özer replaced Deniz Seki as a judge. This week also a semi-nude picture of Barış posing for the Aktüel magazine was revealed which was heavily criticized by the judges.

Elimination chart 
Colour key

Note
 1 Judge Deniz Seki criticized Bayhan over his criminal past when he won the first place, the crowd booed her which made her leave the TV show on the spot, not wanting to return as judge as long as Bayhan was still a contestant on the show. The next week she was replaced by Zerrin Özer.

Discography 
 Popstar Türkiye - Various artists (December 2003)
 Popstar Top 10 En İyi Performans Şarkıları - Various artists (2004)

References

External links
 
 

Kanal D original programming
2000s Turkish television series
2003 Turkish television series debuts
2004 Turkish television series endings
Turkish-language television shows
Popstars
Television series by Fremantle (company)